James Hardy Wilkinson FRS (27 September 1919 – 5 October 1986) was a prominent figure in the field of numerical analysis, a field at the boundary of applied mathematics and computer science particularly useful to physics and engineering.

Education
Born in Strood, England, he won a Foundation Scholarship to Sir Joseph Williamson's Mathematical School in Rochester. He studied the Cambridge Mathematical Tripos at Trinity College, Cambridge, where he graduated as Senior Wrangler.

Career
Taking up war work in 1940, he began working on ballistics but transferred to the National Physical Laboratory in 1946, where he worked with Alan Turing on the ACE computer project. Later, Wilkinson's interests took him into the numerical analysis field, where he discovered many significant algorithms.

Awards and honours
Wilkinson received the Turing Award in 1970 "for his research in numerical analysis to facilitate the use of the high-speed digital computer, having received special recognition for his work in computations in linear algebra and 'backward' error analysis."  In the same year, he also gave the Society for Industrial and Applied Mathematics (SIAM) John von Neumann Lecture.

Wilkinson also received an Honorary Doctorate from Heriot-Watt University in 1973.

He was elected as a Distinguished Fellow of the British Computer Society in 1974 for his pioneering work in computer science.

The James H. Wilkinson Prize in Numerical Analysis and Scientific Computing, established in 1982 by SIAM, and J. H. Wilkinson Prize for Numerical Software, established in 1991, are named in his honour.

In 1987, Wilkinson won the Chauvenet Prize of the Mathematical Association of America, for his paper "The Perfidious Polynomial".

Personal life
Wilkinson married Heather Ware in 1945. He died at home of a heart attack on October 5, 1986. His wife and their son survived him, a daughter having predeceased him.

Selected works
  (REAP)
  (AEP)
 with Christian Reinsch: Handbook for Automatic Computation, Volume II, Linear Algebra, Springer-Verlag, 1971
 The Perfidious Polynomial. In: Studies in Numerical Analysis, pp. 1–28, MAA Stud. Math., 24, Math. Assoc. America, Washington, DC, 1984

References

External links

  
 

1919 births
1986 deaths
20th-century British mathematicians
British computer scientists
Turing Award laureates
Alumni of Trinity College, Cambridge
Fellows of the British Computer Society
Fellows of the Royal Society
People from Strood
People educated at Sir Joseph Williamson's Mathematical School
Senior Wranglers
Numerical analysts
Scientists of the National Physical Laboratory (United Kingdom)